Kessler is an unincorporated community in Miami County, in the U.S. state of Ohio.

History
A post office called Kessler was established in 1862, and remained in operation until 1913. Besides the post office, Kessler had a railroad station and grain elevator.

References

Unincorporated communities in Miami County, Ohio
Unincorporated communities in Ohio